Ilybius hozgargantae is a species of beetle in family Dytiscidae. It is endemic to Spain.

References
 

hozgargantae
Endemic fauna of Spain
Endemic insects of the Iberian Peninsula
Beetles of Europe
Beetles described in 1983
Taxonomy articles created by Polbot
Taxobox binomials not recognized by IUCN